Anastasios 'Tasos' Papazoglou (born 24 September 1988) is a Greek professional footballer who plays as a centre-back for Super League 2 club Panserraikos, for which he is captain.

Club career

Panserraikos
Papazoglou's first football steps were taken at the age of six in football academies of Giorgos Koudas in Thessaloniki, but soon after he moved to an amateur club AS Neapoli. From there he moved to Panserraikos, making his senior team debut during the 2006–07 season. He stayed to the club for over five years, managing also to wear captain's armband. During his spell with Panserraikos, he was also converted from midfielder to central defender.

Olympiacos
His performances impressed the technical staff of Olympiacos and on 30 August 2010, he signed a five-year contract with the Greek giants. However, due to Olympiacos' completeness in this position, he was immediately given on loan back to Panserraikos for the 2010–11 season. After a remarkable presence during his loan to Panserraikos (24 appearances, 2 goals), apart from the positive feedback received from the media, he secured his return to Olympiacos in the summer of 2011. Papazoglou had a three-year presence at Olympiacos, appearing in 46 matches and scoring two goals in all competitions, managing to win three championships and two cups. On 23 July 2014, his contract with the club was terminated, as he was not among Olympiacos's plans for the 2014–15 season.

APOEL
On 23 July 2014, Papazoglou signed a one-year contract, with the option of a further season with Cypriot champions APOEL. He made his debut against HJK Helsinki at GSP Stadium on 6 August 2014, in APOEL's 2–0 victory for the third qualifying round of the 2014–15 UEFA Champions League. He made his only 2014–15 UEFA Champions League group stage appearance with APOEL on 10 December 2014, playing the full 90 minutes in APOEL's 4–0 defeat against Ajax at Amsterdam Arena. On 1 February 2015, his contract with APOEL was terminated.

Xanthi
At the end of January transfer period, Xanthi proceeded to the acquisition of Papazoglou. At the end of the season, Papazoglou solved his contract with the club.

Panetolikos
On 11 August 2015, Panetolikos announced a two-year contract with the player for an undisclosed fee.
On 6 September 2016, Papazoglou suffered a meniscus rupture, ruptured medial collateral ligament and anterior cruciate rupture in a friendly game against AEL, in a nasty tackle from Nico Varela. From February 25, 2017, he has returned in the team, while, on April 5,in the last Super League game against Xanthi was a starter.

Apollon Smyrnis
On 17 July 2017, Apollon Smyrnis officially announced the signing of central defender for an undisclosed fee.

OFI
On 20 July 2018, OFI officially announced the signing of central defender for an undisclosed fee.

On 28 May 2019, the team announced that his contract would not be renewed.

Zira
On 17 July 2019, Papazoglou signed one-year contract with Zira FK.

Second spell at Xanthi
On 1 October 2020, Papazoglou signed a contract with Xanthi F.C.

International career
Papazoglou was a part of the Greek national under-19 team squad that reached the final of the 2007 UEFA European Under-19 Championship and managed to win the 2nd place. Then he became a member of the Greek national under-21 team, contributing significantly to his team's qualification for the play-offs of the 2011 UEFA European Under-21 Championship.

Career statistics

Honours

Club
Olympiacos
Superleague Greece (3) : 2011–12, 2012–13, 2013–14
Greek Cup (2) : 2011–12, 2012–13

International
Greece U19 
UEFA European Under-19 Championship : Runner-up 2007

References

External links

Onsports.gr Profile

1988 births
Living people
Footballers from Serres
Greek footballers
Association football defenders
Football League (Greece) players
Super League Greece players
Cypriot First Division players
Azerbaijan Premier League players
Panserraikos F.C. players
Olympiacos F.C. players
APOEL FC players
Xanthi F.C. players
Panetolikos F.C. players
Apollon Smyrnis F.C. players
OFI Crete F.C. players
Zira FK players
Greece youth international footballers
Greece under-21 international footballers
Greek expatriate footballers
Greek expatriate sportspeople in Cyprus
Expatriate footballers in Azerbaijan